Sherman Creek flows into the West Branch Delaware River by Hale Eddy, New York.

References

Rivers of New York (state)
Rivers of Pennsylvania
Rivers of Wayne County, Pennsylvania
Rivers of Broome County, New York
Tributaries of the West Branch Delaware River